The term lysin may refer to any protein that causes cell lysis, such as:
Most commonly, phage lysins, also known as endolysins
Autolysin
Cytolysin
Egg lysin
Hemolysin
NK-lysin
Streptolysin

See also 
Cell lysis
Toxin